The city of San Francisco de Paula de Yare is the capital of the Simón Bolívar Municipality, in the state of Miranda in Venezuela.

See also
 Dancing Devils of Yare

Cities in Miranda (state)